The 1948 World Professional Basketball Tournament was the tenth and final edition of the World Professional Basketball Tournament. It was held in Chicago, Illinois, during the days of 8-11 April 1948 and featured eight teams. It was won by the Minneapolis Lakers who defeated the New York Renaissance 75–71 in the title game, behind George Mikan's tournament record 40 points. The Anderson Duffey Packers came in third after beating the Tri-Cities Blackhawks 66–44 in the third-place game. Mikan led all scorers and was named the tournaments Most Valuable Player.

Results

Bracket

Third place game

Championship game

Individual awards

All-Tournament First team 
 C - George Mikan, Minneapolis Lakers (MVP)
 F - Nat Clifton, New York Rens
 F - Jim Pollard, Minneapolis Lakers
 G - Charley Shipp, Anderson Duffey Packers
 G - Herm Schaefer, Minneapolis Lakers

All-Tournament Second team 
 C - Howie Schultz, Anderson Duffey Packers
 F - Dick Triptow, Fort Wayne Zollner Pistons
 F - John Hargis, Anderson Duffey Packers
 F - Howie Schultz, Anderson Duffey Packers
 G - Bobby McDermott, Tri-City Blackhawks
 G - George Crowe, New York Rens

References

External links 
 WPBT 1939-48 on apbr.org

World Professional Basketball Tournament